Kunavaram is a village in Alluri Sitharama Raju district, Andhra Pradesh. Kunavaram was a part of Khammam district of then newly formed Telangana until the transfer of 7 mandals including it to then newly formed Andhra Pradesh.

Geography
It has an average elevation of 28 metres (95 ft).

References 

Villages in Alluri Sitharama Raju district